Tsitsino Kakhabrishvili (born 14 November 1946) is a Georgian chess player, her highest rating is 2185 (in Jan. 1987) 

She is the National Georgian Woman Chess Champion 4 times in the years: 1966, 1970, 1973, and 1982.

References

1946 births
Living people
Female chess players from Georgia (country)
People from Georgia (country)